The Deputy Speaker of the Maharashtra Legislative Assembly is subordinate to the speaker of the Legislative Assembly of Maharashtra.  They are responsible for the Legislative Assembly of Maharashtra and they are the second highest ranking legislative officer of the Legislative Assembly of Maharashtra, the lower house of the Government of Maharashtra. They act as the presiding officer in case of leave or absence caused by death or illness of the Speaker of the Legislative Assembly of Maharashtra.

List of Deputy Speakers

See also
List of governors of Maharashtra
List of chief ministers of Maharashtra
List of deputy chief ministers of Maharashtra
List of Chairman of the Maharashtra Legislative Council
List of speakers of the Maharashtra Legislative Assembly

List of Leader of the House of the Maharashtra Legislative Assembly
List of Leaders of the House of the Maharashtra Legislative Council
List of Leader of the Opposition of the Maharashtra Legislative Assembly
List of Leader of the Opposition of the Maharashtra Legislative Council

References

Government of Maharashtra
Maharashtra-related lists